Edmund Hancock was an English professional association footballer who played as a winger.

Following spells at Denaby United and Gainsborough Trinity, he signed for Liverpool in January 1931, before making his debut in March 1932 against Huddersfield Town.

He played ten games for Liverpool before departing for Burnley in 1933.

References

People from Conisbrough
Footballers from Doncaster
English footballers
Association football midfielders
Liverpool F.C. players
Burnley F.C. players
Luton Town F.C. players
Northwich Victoria F.C. players
Lincoln City F.C. players
English Football League players
Year of death missing
1907 births